A1 Team Indonesia is the Indonesian team of A1 Grand Prix, an international racing series.

Management 

A1 Team Indonesia has been operating since January 2008 by Performance Racing, which provide technical and race services. Its team now is managed by Bobby Issazadhe and helped by their new race engineer, Dave Luff. The new team principal is Bagoes Hermanto.

History

2008–09 season 

Driver: Satrio Hermanto, Zahir Ali

2007–08 season 

Driver: Satrio Hermanto

Team Indonesia again only managed to score in a single race, this time not scoring until the final race of the season. They finished in 21st position with a single point.

2006–07 season 

Drivers: Ananda Mikola, Moreno Soeprapto

Team Indonesia only managed to score in a single race, finishing in 21st position with a single point.

2005–06 season 

Driver: Ananda Mikola

In the inaugural season, Team Indonesia scored points on four occasions, finishing in 18th position with 16 points.

Drivers

Complete A1 Grand Prix results 

(key), "spr" indicate a Sprint Race, "fea" indicate a Main Race.

 (1) = Since Taupo, New Zealand round, January 2008

References

External links 

 Official Web Site of A1 Grand Prix
 Official Web Site of A1 Team Indonesia

Indonesia A1 team
National sports teams of Indonesia
Auto racing teams established in 2005
Auto racing teams disestablished in 2009